Malinowice  is a village in the administrative district of Gmina Psary, within Będzin County, Silesian Voivodeship, in southern Poland.

The village has a population of 616.

References

Malinowice